Poecilus quadricollis is a species of ground beetle belonging to the family Carabidae. This species can be found in France, Portugal, Spain and in North Africa.

References links
Poecilus quadricollis at Fauna Europaea

Pterostichinae
Beetles described in 1828